David Hodgson (born 8 August 1981), also known by the nicknames of "Dodgey" and "Hodgey", is an English rugby league coach, and former rugby league footballer who played in the 1990s, 2000s and 2010s. He played at representative level for Great Britain, England, and Yorkshire, and at club level for Halifax (Heritage No. 1119), the Wigan Warriors (Heritage No. 934), the Salford City Reds, the Huddersfield Giants and the Hull Kingston Rovers (Heritage No.)

Background
David Hodgson was born in Kingston upon Hull, Humberside, England.

Halifax
Hodgson began his career at Halifax in 1999, before moving to the Wigan Warriors in 2000, a tribunal fixing a £45,000 fee.

Wigan Warriors

He signed for the Salford City Reds from the Wigan Warriors and when his contract expired at the end of 2004, following bad injury. Prior to joining Salford City Reds he had made 122 Super League appearances in which time he scored 48 tries.

Salford City Reds
Hodgson regained full fitness at the Salford City Reds, and had a fantastic 2006 – which saw him named in the Great Britain standby squad for the Tri-Nations, the engage Super League Dream Team and also being named Supporter's Player of the Year and Player's Player of the Year at the Salford City Reds' annual awards ceremony. The club finished fifth in 2006's Super League XI, their highest ever position, and went on to the end of season play-offs for the first time.

On 11 March 2006, he scored a club Super League record 8-goal kicks – despite having never kicked a goal before the start of 2006's Super League XI.

Huddersfield Giants
In September 2007 Hodgson signed for the Huddersfield Giants, following the Salford City Reds' relegation from Super League.

Hull Kingston Rovers
On 18 July 2011, Hodgson signed a three-year deal with his hometown club the Hull Kingston Rovers.

Representative
On 10 November Hodgson made his first appearance of Great Britain's test series against New Zealand and scored.

In June 2007 he was called up to the Great Britain squad for the Test match against France

He was named in the England training squad for the 2008 Rugby League World Cup.

He was named in the England team to face Wales at the Keepmoat Stadium prior to England's departure for the 2008 Rugby League World Cup.

Post playing career
On 3 October 2014, Hodgson announced his retirement and he signed a two-year contract to stay at his hometown club Hull Kingston Rovers as an assistant coach, along with Willie Poching.

References

External links

Statistics at wigan.rlfans.com
(archived by web.archive.org) 2001 Ashes profile
(archived by web.archive.org) Statistics at hullkr.co.uk
(archived by web.archive.org) Salford Squad Profile: David Hodgson

1981 births
Living people
England national rugby league team players
English rugby league coaches
English rugby league players
Great Britain national rugby league team players
Halifax R.L.F.C. players
Huddersfield Giants players
Hull Kingston Rovers players
Rugby league centres
Rugby league fullbacks
Rugby league players from Kingston upon Hull
Rugby league wingers
Salford Red Devils players
Wigan Warriors players
Yorkshire rugby league team players